Sebert may refer to:

Sæberht of Essex, (died c. 616), Anglo-Saxon King of Essex 
Günter Sebert (born 1948), German footballer
Kesha Sebert (born 1987), American musician known mononymously as Kesha
Lou Sebert (born 1935), American politician
Louis Sebert (sprinter) (1886–1942), Canadian athlete
Louis Sebert (politician), Canadian politician
Pebe Sebert (born 1956), American musician